Manapouri is a rural locality in the Toowoomba Region, Queensland, Australia. In the  Manapouri had a population of 52 people.

History 
Manipouri State School opened circa 1923. Around 1930 the spelling was changed to Manapouri State School. It closed circa 1952.

In the  Manapouri had a population of 52 people.

References 

Toowoomba Region
Localities in Queensland